Continental AG, commonly known as Continental or colloquially as Conti, is a German multinational automotive parts manufacturing company specializing in tires, brake systems, interior electronics, automotive safety, powertrain and chassis components, tachographs, and other parts for the automotive and transportation industries. Continental is structured into six divisions: Chassis and Safety, Powertrain, Interior, Tires, ContiTech, ADAS (Advanced Driver Assistance Systems). It is headquartered in Hanover, Lower Saxony. Continental is the world's fourth-largest tire manufacturer.

Continental sells tires for automobiles, motorcycles, and bicycles worldwide under the Continental brand. It also produces and sells other brands with more select distribution such as Viking (limited global presence), General (US/Canada), Gislaved (Canada, Spain, Nordic Markets), Semperit Tyres, Barum to serve EU & Russia. Other brands are Uniroyal (Europe), Sportiva, Mabor and Matador and formerly Sime/Simex tyres (now Dunlop Tyres Malaysia, Singapore and Brunei). Continental's customers include all major automobile, truck and bus producers, such as Volkswagen, Daimler AG, BharatBenz, Ford, Volvo, Iveco, Schmitz, Koegel, Freightliner Trucks, BMW, General Motors, Toyota, Honda, Renault, PSA and Porsche.

History  

Continental was founded in 1871 as a rubber manufacturer, Continental-Caoutchouc und Gutta-Percha Compagnie. In 1898, Continental started development and production of the vehicle tires with plain tread, which was the major success of the brand. In 1904, Continental became the first company in the world to manufacture grooved vehicle tires. Another major product Continental invented was detachable wheel tire that was made for touring vehicles (1905). In the late 1920s, Continental merged with several other major rubber industry companies to form the largest rubber company in Germany "Continental Gummi-Werke AG".

Nazi era 
When the Nazis came to power in Germany in 1933, all members of the Board of Management as well as the authorized signatories and directors of the second management level were obliged to join the Nazi party, the Works Council was purged of "opponents of the regime," and all Jewish members of the Supervisory Board were forced to resign. As early as the end of 1933, the Executive Board could proudly announce that Continental was now "a Christian and purely German company"

As with many other German companies during World War II, Continental used slave labor provided by the Nazi Party in their factories in the 1940s at Hannover-Stöcken, Hannover-Limmer, Hannover-Ahlem, and others, all offshoots of the Neuengamme concentration camp.

Postwar 
Continental teamed up with FATE in 1999 for the production of tires for cars, trucks, and buses in Argentina and exportation of the San Fernando plant's production to the rest of South America.

In 2001, Continental acquired a controlling interest in Temic, DaimlerChrysler's automotive-electronics business, which is now part of Continental Automotive Systems. The company also purchased German automotive rubber and plastics company Phoenix AG in 2004, and the automotive electronics unit of Motorola in 2006. Continental acquired Siemens VDO from Siemens AG in 2007. Also in 2007, the company began to construct a plant in Costa Rica to produce powertrain components for North America.  The plant was to open in two phases and ultimately employ 550 workers.

In 2008, Continental appeared overextended with its integration of VDO and had since lost almost half of its market capitalisation when it found itself to be the hostile takeover target of the family-owned Schaeffler AG. By 2009, Schaeffler successfully installed the head of its motor division at the helm of Continental.

Continental was ranked third in global OEM automotive parts sales in 2012 according to a study sponsored by PricewaterhouseCoopers. On 6 September 2012, Continental returned to the benchmark DAX index of 30 selected German blue chip stocks after a 45-month absence. IHO Group (investment holding of the Schaeffler family) is the controlling shareholder and currently owns 46% of Continental shares. In November 2018, Continental purchased Kmart Tyre and Auto in Australia from Wesfarmers for A$350 million.

On 13 November 2020, it was announced that Nikolai Setzer would take over as CEO following the short-notice resignation of Elmar Degenhart.

In February 2021, Continental announced that it acquired a minority stake in Recogni, a German-U.S. start-up, to advance its autonomous driving technology. The start-up is working on a new chip architecture for object recognition in real time based on artificial intelligence.

In December 2021, as a result of a diplomatic spat between Lithuania and China over Taiwan and human rights China pressured Continental AG to stop doing business with Lithuania.

In April 2022, Continental resumed production of tires in Russia despite International sanctions during the Russo-Ukrainian War due to 2022 Russian invasion of Ukraine.

Interior Division 
The Interior Division is organised under the following five business units:
 Body & Security
 Commercial Vehicles & Aftermarket
 Infotainment & Connectivity
 Intelligent Transportation Systems
 Instrumentation & Driver HMI
 Autonomous Mobility

Body & Security is leading the development of Vehicle Electronics and Cabin Control Systems, with R&D locations in Germany, United States, China, Singapore, Mexico, India, and many other locations around the world, allowing a global reach to nearly every market region.

Schaeffler takeover 

When Continental decided to purchase ITT Industries' brake and chassis business for $1.93 billion in 1998, the head of ITT's brake division, Juergen M. Geissinger, was hired as the CEO of the family-owned bearing and auto parts manufacturer Schaeffler Group.

Ten years later, Geissinger returned to Continental with mother-and-son owners Maria-Elisabeth and Georg Schaeffler and a consortium of banks, to buy control of the company. Continental appeared to have overextended itself with the acquisition of Siemens' VDO automotive unit in 2007 for €11.4 billion and had lost almost half of its market capitalisation since.

In August 2008 and after a protracted standoff, Continental agreed to be taken over by the Schaeffler Group in a deal that valued the company at approximately €12 billion. Schaeffler in return agreed to limit its position to less than 50% for a period of four years and support Continental's ongoing strategy. This arrangement was overseen by former German Chancellor Gerhard Schroeder. Continental's CEO Manfred Wennemer, who had opposed Schaeffler's offer, resigned and was succeeded by Karl-Thomas Neumann on 1 September 2008. Less than one year later, Schaeffler's CEO Juergen Geissinger succeeded in installing his longtime confidant (and former leader and later head of ITT Teves/Continental Brake and Chassis Division) Elmar Degenhart, the head of his automotive division, as the new chief executive of Continental, ousting Neumann. At Continental's 2013 annual shareholder meeting Schaeffler gave notice that it will terminate its mutual investment agreement with Continental in May 2014, on which Elmar Degenhart commented, "Notice of termination of the investment agreement is understandable from the vantage point of Schaeffler, our anchor shareholder. We are confident that the two companies will continue their very good and goal-oriented cooperation on into the future."

Continental Tire the Americas, LLC 
Continental Tire entered the North American tire industry with its 1987 purchase of General Tire from GenCorp, forming Continental General Tire Corp . At the time, Continental was following other tire manufacturers, such as Bridgestone and Michelin, into the American tire market.

The headquarters for North and South American tire divisions is located in the Charlotte metropolitan area at Fort Mill, South Carolina, United States. The North American headquarters of the CAS division is located in Auburn Hills, Michigan, directly east of the Great Lakes Crossing mall. Continental also has a research and development arm in the tech-heavy Silicon Valley, where, among other things, the company focuses on developing technologies supporting autonomous driving vehicles.

From 2002 through 2005, the subsidiary sponsored a new college football bowl game in Charlotte, North Carolina, known for three playings as the Continental Tire Bowl. At the time, Continental was a major employer in Charlotte. However, as financial woes set in at the division Meineke Car Care Center took over sponsorship of the Charlotte bowl game from Continental. The first two Continental Tire Bowls were both won by Virginia; the third and final (by that name) edition of the bowl was won by Boston College.

The subsidiary announced that effective 1 January 2006, it would implement massive cuts on health care for retirees across the country.  After a class-action lawsuit, the company and United Steelworkers union, representing the retirees, agreed to a settlement whereby the company would continue to fund benefits. Later that year, it announced it would cease tire production in Charlotte and would close its tire production plant in Mayfield, Kentucky.

In 2011, CTA announced that it would build a plant in Sumter, South Carolina.  The plant will cost about $500 million and employ 1,600 workers by 2020.

In February 2016, CTA announced that it would build a Commercial Tire plant in Clinton, Mississippi, with an investment totaling approximately $1.4 billion and employing 2,500 people when the plant reaches full capacity in the next decade.

In October 2016, CTA purchased Hoosier Racing Tire.

Automotive electrical-energy storage systems 
Continental was one of the companies bidding to work with GM to provide the battery pack for the Chevrolet Volt extended-range electric vehicle (E-REV). It is the primary contractor for a system using lithium-ion batteries from A123 Systems. GM instead signed a contract to assemble packs with cells purchased from Compact Power.

Continental continues to look at developments and innovation in the field of Automotive electrical-energy storage systems. These include developing solutions for gasoline and diesel driven engines as well as the rapidly-developing area of electrified systems. By offering a comprehensive technology toolkit to auto manufacturers, they enable these manufacturers to develop customised electrification in their vehicles, resulting in more efficient systems that produce lower emissions.

Automotive PACE Awards 
In April 2016, Continental AG together with Honda's US subsidiary, were honored with the 2016 Automotive News PACE Innovation Partnership Award for the Bidirectional Long Range Communications (BLRC) System, developed by the Body and Security Team in the Interior Division. The Radio Frequency Device, helps the car user to operate a remote control key fob from more than half a kilometer away, to start the engine and climate control function, while receiving feedback from the vehicle (such as locked/unlocked). The Radio Frequency System, powered by a single standard coin cell, and an innovative vehicle-mounted RF transceiver, was developed together by Honda and Continental, and was debuted on the Acura MDX in 2013 and was quickly followed by the Acura TLX and Acura RLX in 2014.

In 2015, Continental AG was honored with two PACE Awards for its Bare Die High-Density-Interconnect (BD-HDI) Printed Circuit Board Substrate Technology for Transmission Electronics and its Multi-application Unified Sensor Element (MUSE).
In 2018, Continental won a PACE (Premier Automotive Suppliers' Contribution to Excellence) Award for its Digital Micromirror Head-Up Display technology. Along with Audi, Continental also received an Innovation Partnership Award for their Safety Domain Control Unit (SDCU).

In 2020, Continental won an inaugural PACEpilot award for its Virtual A-Pillar technology that helps to eliminate forward blind spots. PACEpilot is an offshoot of the long-standing PACE awards, and the programmes seeks to recognise innovations in automative technology that have moved to the working model phase of testing.

Executive management

Chief executive officer
 1973–1982: Carl Hahn
 1991–1999: Hubertus von Grünberg
 1999–2001: Stephan Kessel
 2001–2008: Manfred Wennemer
 2008–2009: Karl-Thomas Neumann
 2009–30 November 2020: Elmar Degenhart
 1 December 2020–present: Nikolai Setzer

Chairman of the board
 Unknown–1989: Alfred Herrhausen
 1999–2009: Hubertus von Grünberg
 2009–2009: Rolf Koerfer (6 March–28 September)
 2009–present: Wolfgang Reitzle

Supervisory board
 Werner Bischoff*
 Michael Deister
 Gunter Dunkel
 Hans Fischl*
 Juergen M. Geissinger
 Hans-Olaf Henkel
 Michael Iglhaut*
 Jörg Köhlinger*
 Klaus Mangold
 Hartmut Meine*
 Dirk Nordmann*
 Artur Otto•
 Wolfgang Reitzle (Chairman)
 Klaus Rosenfeld
 Georg F. W. Schaeffler
 Maria-Elisabeth Schaeffler
 Jörg Schönfelder*
 Bernd W. Voss
 Siegfried Wolf
 Erwin Wörle*
 Aydin Aliyev*
 Tural Omarov*

'*' denotes labor representative

Acquisition of Veyance Technologies Inc. 
Continental AG has acquired the American rubber company Veyance Technologies Inc. based in Fairlawn, Ohio. Veyance will be integrated into the company's ContiTech division, and will serve as the regional home office for ContiTech in North America.

The Brazilian antitrust authority Council for Economic Defence (CADE) made it official on 29 January 2015, described in a press release on the 30th, from the company. The total transition was $1.6 billion. The company will divest Veyance's NAFTA air springs business in Mexico and its Brazilian steel-cord belting business in response to some of the concerns raised by antitrust authorities, the release said, employing about 600 people work in those operations.

See also 

Continental Automotive Systems – one of the five divisions
Hoosier Racing Tire – part of the tire division

References

External links

 

 
Automotive companies of Germany
German brands
Tire manufacturers of Germany
Cycle parts manufacturers
German companies established in 1871
Automotive companies established in 1871
Multinational companies headquartered in Germany
Formula One tyre suppliers